Gareth Stephens (born 15 April 1974) is a former professional rugby league footballer who played as a  or  in the 1990s and 2000s. He played at representative level for Great Britain (Under-21s), and Wales, and at club level for Leeds where he signed a record schoolboy contract and made his first team debut at the age of 17, Castleford Tigers (Heritage No. 710), Hull FC, Sheffield Eagles and the York Wasps.

Background
Stephens was born in Pontefract, West Yorkshire, England, and he is the son of Gary Stephens, former rugby league international footballer of the 1960s, 1970s and 1980s.

Playing career

Club career
Stephens started his career at Leeds, making his début in September 1991. He was signed by Castleford for £65000 in July 1994. He went on to play for Hull FC, Sheffield Eagles, Halifax Blue Sox and York Wasps.

International honours
Stephens won caps at Great Britain academy and U21 level along with four caps for Wales between 1995 and 1998, including at the 1995 Rugby League World Cup.

References

External links
(archived by web.archive.org) World Cup 1995 details
 

1974 births
Living people
Castleford Tigers players
English people of Welsh descent
English rugby league players
Great Britain under-21 national rugby league team players
Halifax R.L.F.C. players
Hull F.C. players
Leeds Rhinos players
Rugby league five-eighths
Rugby league halfbacks
Rugby league players from Pontefract
Sheffield Eagles players
Wales national rugby league team players
York Wasps players